Pierre Cousin is the name of

 Pierre Cousin (mathematician) (1867–1933), French mathematician
 Pierre Cousin (athlete) (born 1913), French marathon runner